Easton Corbin is the debut studio album by the American country music artist of the same name. It was released on March 2, 2010 via Universal Music Group Nashville's Mercury Nashville division. The album's first two singles, "A Little More Country Than That" and "Roll With It", became Corbin's first two number one hits on the US Billboard Hot Country Songs chart. The album's third single, "I Can't Love You Back", peaked at number 14.

Singles
The first single from the album, "A Little More Country Than That," was released to Country radio in July 2009. It subsequently debuted on the Billboard Hot Country Songs chart for the chart week of August 22, 2009. In March 2010, it became his first Number One song. Followup "Roll with It" has also reached number one on the same chart. The album's third single "I Can't Love You Back" released to radio on November 8, 2010.

In a news blog on CMT, Corbin talked about the first release from his debut album saying: "This song identifies who I am. It shows character and that's important where I'm from. You learn to say 'yes, ma'am' and 'no, sir' and to open the door for the ladies."

Reception

Commercial
Easton Corbin debuted at #4 on the U.S. Billboard Top Country Albums and #10 on the U.S. Billboard 200, selling 43,000 copies in its first week of release. As of the chart dated May 21, 2011, the album has sold 371,167 copies in the US.

Critical

Upon its release, Easton Corbin received generally positive reviews from most music critics. At Metacritic, which assigns a normalized rating out of 100 to reviews from mainstream critics, the album received an average score of 75, based on 5 reviews, which indicates "generally favorable reviews".

Karlie Justus of Engine 145 gave the album four out of five stars, citing the neotraditionalist country production choices, that make the album sound modern, fresh, and mainstream-friendly. She also praises the album's producer, Carson Chamberlain,  for giving the album an "easy, natural feel." Stuart Munro with The Boston Globe called it a "real country" record, saying it "challenges those who claim there’s no longer any “real country’’ to be found in modern mainstream country music" and positively compared Corbin to George Strait and Alan Jackson.

Country Weekly reviewer Jessica Phillips also commended Chamberlain's production and compared Corbin's voice to those of George Strait and Keith Whitley, saying that Corbin sounded "authentic and confident." She gave the album three-and-a-half stars out of five. Allmusic critic Todd Sterling also compared Corbin's voice to Strait's and praised the neotraditionalist country sound of the album, giving it three-and-a-half stars out of five. In her review for Entertainment Weekly, critic Whitney Pastorek also noted the similarities between Corbin's voice and Strait's, and she suggested that the album would make a listener "remember why you fell in love with country music in the first place" and gave the album a "B+" grade. Slant Magazine critic Jonathan Keefe was less enthusiastic, praising Corbin both for his songwriting and his ambition in emulating a "genre legend" like Strait, but commenting that the material on the album was generally weak and rating the album with two-and-a-half stars out of five.

Track listing

Personnel

Production
 Darryl Bowslaugh – Make-Up
 Jason Campbell – Production Coordination
 Carson Chamberlain – Producer
 Joe Fisher – A&R
 John Kelton – Engineer, Mixing
 Renee Layer – Wardrobe
 Ken Love – Mastering
 James Minchin III – Photography
 Karen Naff – Art Direction, Design
 Matt Rovey – Assistant, Engineer
 Brian Wright – A&R
 Stephanie Wright – A&R

Additional musicians
 Eddie Bayers – Drums
 Jimmy Carter – Bass guitar
 Easton Corbin – Lead Vocals
 Larry Franklin – Fiddle, Mandolin
 Paul Franklin – Steel Guitar
 Wes Hightower – Background Vocals
 Brent Mason – Electric Guitar
 James Mitchell – Electric Guitar
 Gary Prim – Hammond B3 Organ, Keyboards, Piano, Wurlitzer
 Biff Watson – Acoustic Guitar, Gut String Guitar
 Glenn Worf – Bass guitar

Charts

Album

End of year charts

Singles

References

2010 debut albums
Easton Corbin albums
Mercury Nashville albums
Albums produced by Carson Chamberlain